The Independent Election Commission of Afghanistan (IEC) was the national electoral commission of Afghanistan, which was responsible for administering and supervising elections and referendums under the Constitution of Afghanistan.

The commission was established in 2006. It was dissolved by the Taliban regime in December 2021.

In March 2014, the commission's headquarters were attacked by the Taliban.

References

Afghanistan
Elections in Afghanistan
2021 disestablishments in Afghanistan
2006 establishments in Afghanistan